The lipspot moray eel (Gymnothorax chilospilus), also known as the textile moray, white-lipped moray or white-lipped reef eel, is a moray eel found in coral reefs in the Pacific and Indian Oceans. It was first named by Pieter Bleeker in 1864.

It is named for a distinct white spot on the lower lip near the corner of the mouth.

References

External links
 Fishes of Australia : Gymnothorax chilospilus

lipspot moray
Marine fish of Northern Australia
lipspot moray